Singam is a 2010 Indian Tamil-language action film written and directed by Hari, and produced by K. E. Gnanavel Raja under his Studio Green banner in association with Reliance Big Pictures, and distributed by Sun Pictures. It stars Suriya in the lead role, marking his 25th film, with Anushka Shetty, Prakash Raj and Vivek in other lead roles. It is the first installment in the Singam franchise. The film was released on 28 May 2010.

The film was a commercial success at the box office, and was remade in Kannada as Kempe Gowda, in Hindi as Singham, in Bengali as Shotru and in Punjabi as Singham. It was followed by the sequels Singam II (2013) and Si3 (2017).

Plot
Duraisingam is an honest SI of Nallur, a small village in Thoothukudi district in southern Tamil Nadu, assisted by his bumbling colleague Yettu Erimalai. He belongs to Nallur with his father Soundarapandi, having a respectable status in the village. His family business is provision stores, and Singam wants to join it, but he joined the police due to Soundarapandi's wishes. He resolves most of the problems in his village with non-violence and mutual counselling. He uses force only when the situation demands it, thereby gaining much reputation and love from the villagers. Mahalingam, an industrialist in Chennai and friend of Soundarapandi, comes to the village with his daughters Kavya and Divya. Singam initially thinks of Kavya as a tiger when she is about to prank her cousin by wearing a tiger costume. As Singam is roaming around the village, he accidentally slaps her. As Kavya is about to take revenge on Singam, he apologizes to her. Kavya gets moved by this and slowly falls in love with him. After some hilarious incidents, Kavya professes her love to Singam. Initially taken aback, Singam soon reciprocates Kavya's love.

Meanwhile, Mayil Vaaganam is a Chennai-based big-time extortionist with shady mafia dealings who blackmails people by complaining to the Income Tax Department, is required to travel to Nallur to sign a conditional bail. Instead, Mayil sends one of his allies to do the formalities, much to the anger and rage of Singam, who demands that Mayil sign the bail in person. Humiliated, Mayil reaches Nallur but is unable to take any revenge on Singam, fearing the immense love and devotion of the entire village towards Singam. Using political contacts, Mayil Vaaganam gets Singam transferred to Chennai to teach him a lesson. Singam, unaware of Mayil's hand behind his transfer, joins Thiruvanmiyur police station. His coworker SI Ravi hates Mayil for his crimes, but is unable to take any action because of Mayil's political powers. Rajendran, Singam's senior is on Mayil's payroll and takes care in concealing and eliminating the evidence of Mayil's crimes from the eyes of the law. The Commissioner also does not help Singam as there is no evidence against Mayil, and Rajendran warns Singam to stay away from Mayil's case.

Unable to take on Mayil in his stronghold, Singam wants to return to his village, but is stopped by Kavya, who encourages him to fight against Mayil and end his crime network. Being mentally tortured by Mayil, Singam arrests Mayil's brother Vaikuntam in a fake case of illegally smuggling alcohol. He thwarts off Rajendran in full view of the public when Rajendran, bounded by his duties to Mayil, tries to protect the henchmen. Mayil kidnaps Divya for ransom. Singam rescues her with unexpected help from Home Minister Ramanathan. Singam successfully traces the origins of the kidnapping racket to Mayil and also gets promoted to ACP of the specially-formed Anti-Kidnapping Task Force. Mahalingam, who was hostile to Singam following an altercation with Soundarapandi back at Nallur, softens up and agrees to give him Kavya's hand in marriage. The entire police force, including the Police Commissioner and Rajendran, are now on Singam's side. They decide to help him fight Mayil. They manage to kill Mayil's henchmen in an encounter at a hospital and begin to target everyone and everything related to Mayil.

In retribution, Mayil starts targeting everyone close to Singam, including Kavya, whom he shoots but is saved by Singam, and Ravi, who is hacked to death by Mayil's henchmen. To escape the arrest warrant issued out to him, Mayil kidnaps Karnataka Home minister's daughter. He falsely tells Singam that he is going to Pondicherry with her, when actually he is going to Nellore in Andhra Pradesh to put the police off the track. However, Singam manages to pursue them till Gudur near Nellore, where he rescues her and kills Mayil in an encounter. After that, he resigns his job publicly in a felicitation function organised for him. Singam is seen with Kavya heading back to Nallur. He is stopped briefly by Ramanathan, who offers an undercover mission, to which he willingly agrees.

Cast

Production

Development
After Suriya had finished K. S. Ravikumar's Aadhavan, discussions regarding his subsequent project, notably his 25th film, were held. Initially, reports emerged that it was going to be directed by Prabhu Deva. At the launch of his film Seval in May 2009, however, director Hari announced officially that he would direct Suriya's 25th film titled Singam and that he had finished penning the script. Becoming Suriya's third film with Hari following Aaru and Vel, it was announced that the project would release in July 2010. Suriya's cousin, K. E. Gnanavel Raja was announced as the producer.

Casting
Devi Sri Prasad was chosen as the music director, thus becoming his third venture with Suriya. Suriya was revealed to play a police officer in the film, the second time in his career after Kaakha Kaakha. Anushka was chosen to play the female lead after her second Tamil film Vettaikaaran. Priyan was chosen as the lead camera man and V.T. Vijayan as the editor.

Filming
After completing Seval, Hari joined the cast and crew to start the filming in 2009. The shooting began in Thirunelveli district and was carried on in southern parts of Tamil Nadu. A scene from the song "Stole my Heart" was shot in Muscat Park that was choreographed by Brindha and produced by Renny Johnson who was also a co line producer of the movie. Afterwards, some scenes where shot in Karnataka. The main scenes were shot in Thiruvanmiyur, Chennai. During December, Hari announced that the film wouldn't have a formal audio launch as per his previous films and that the shooting would get over quickly. The trailers were released on 24 February. Sun Pictures acquired the distribution rights, and Sony Music bought the music for a hefty price.

Soundtrack

The film's soundtrack, released on 9 May 2010, was scored by Devi Sri Prasad, marking his third collaboration with Suriya after Maayavi and Aaru and with Hari for second time after Aaru.

Release and reception
The film was released worldwide on 28 May 2010 released in 850 screens worldwide.

Critical reception
Behindwoods gave 2.5 out of 5 and stated that Hari has "concocted and packaged his masala contents in the right proportion and has served a tasty dish", while praising Suriya for having "diligently worked towards balancing the niche and the mass" and proving "once again that he can deliver a commercial masala flick with as finesse as he can deliver a performance-oriented film". Sify described the film as a "predictable entertainer that follows the age old formula", citing that it was Suriya who "carries the film to the winning post. His passion and the way he brings an ordinary regular larger-than-life hero character alive on screen is lesson for other commercial heroes". Rediff also gave 2.5 out of 5 stating that the film was an "unapologetic, entertainer and has Suriya in every frame. Lovers of commercial potpourri will definitely get their money's worth." Indiaglitz wrote that Singam was the "king of the masses, who love action and commercial films". A Times of India critic gave 3.5 out of 5, claiming that "even with a sleepy narration in the first 30 minutes or so, Singam is worth a watch."

Box office
Singam was the third highest grossing Tamil film of the year in Chennai, collecting more than 5.38 crore there. In Malaysia and the United Kingdom, the film collected $1,471,508 and $12,956 respectively.

Remakes and dubbed versions 
Singam was remade in multiple different languages; in Hindi as Singham (2011), in Kannada as Kempe Gowda (2011), in Bengali as Shotru (2011), and in Punjabi as Singham (2019).

It was dubbed in Telugu under the title ,Yamudu, and was released on 2 July 2010. Despite the Hindi remake, the film was dubbed in Hindi under the title The Fighterman Singham.

Sequels

The film's success lead to two sequels: Singam II (2013) and Singam 3 (2017).

Awards

Filmfare Awards South
Best Dance Choreographer – Baba Bhaskar for "Kadhal Vandhale"

Legacy
Santhanam and Soori parodied Suriya's character in Vellore Maavattam (2011) and Varuthapadatha Valibar Sangam (2013), respectively. The famous line in the film, "Ongi Adicha Ondra Tonne Weight" (If I punch you, you will feel one and half tonnes of weight) was used in "The Punch Song", a song from the film, Aaha Kalyanam (2014).

Notes

References

External links
 

Indian action films
2010 action films
2010 masala films
Films set in Chennai
Films shot in Chennai
Films shot in Andhra Pradesh
Films shot in Tirunelveli
2010 films
Tamil films remade in other languages
Films directed by Hari (director)
2010s Tamil-language films
Films scored by Devi Sri Prasad
Fictional portrayals of the Tamil Nadu Police
Fictional portrayals of the Andhra Pradesh Police
Reliance Entertainment films
Indian police films
Singam (film series)
Films shot in Oman